Saeed Ahmed Abdulla Mohammad Al-Bloushi (Arabic:سعيد أحمد عبد الله محمد البلوشي; born 17 January 1994) is an Emirati footballer. He currently plays as a winger / left back for Al Ain.

References

External links
 

Emirati footballers
Emirati people of Baloch descent
1994 births
Living people
Al Ahli Club (Dubai) players
Shabab Al-Ahli Club players
Al Ain FC players
Place of birth missing (living people)
UAE Pro League players
Association football wingers
Association football fullbacks